Kile is a surname. Notable people with the surname include:

 Darryl Kile (1968–2002), American baseball player
 Marit Velle Kile (born 1978), Norwegian actress
 Mikey Kile (born 1983), American stock car racing driver

See also
 Kyle (surname)